Multi-photon microscopy (also spelled multiphoton microscopy) may refer to:

 Two-photon excitation microscopy
 Three photon microscopy
 Second-harmonic imaging microscopy
 Third-harmonic imaging microscopy
 Coherent Raman scattering microscopy
 Stimulated Raman scattering microscopy